This is a list of lighthouses in Easter Island.

Lighthouses

See also
 List of lighthouses in Chile

References

External links
 

Easter Island
Lighthouses